Lee Labrada is a professional bodybuilder, published author and CEO of Labrada Nutrition. He won the title Mr. Universe in 1985 and placed top 4 for seven consecutive years in Mr. Olympia. In 2002, at the request of the city of Houston, Labrada launched the "Get Lean Houston" campaign to combat the city's obesity problem.
In 2004, Labrada was inducted into the IFBB Pro-Bodybuilding Hall of Fame.
In 2005 he wrote a fitness book. He founded the company Labrada Nutrition, which sells nutritional supplements.
He is father of bodybuilder Hunter Labrada.

Publications 
 The Lean Body Promise, 2005. HarperCollins.

See also 
List of male professional bodybuilders
List of female professional bodybuilders

References

External links 
 Labrada Nutrition official website

1960 births
Living people
American bodybuilders
Professional bodybuilders
American male writers
University of Houston alumni
Cuban emigrants to the United States